John Wood Hall (January 1, 1817 – January 23, 1892) was an American merchant and politician from Frederica, in Kent County, Delaware. He was a member of the Democratic Party, who served in the Delaware General Assembly and as Governor of Delaware.

Early life and family
Hall was born in Frederica, Delaware, son of John and Henrietta Bowman Hall. He married Caroline Warren in 1842 and had four children: John Wood, Jr., Samuel Warren, Sarah Henrietta, and Caroline. They lived at 8 David Street in Frederica and were members of the Methodist Church.

Orphaned as a child, Hall worked in a candy store, and eventually saved enough money to buy the business. Not stopping with candy, he expanded into general merchandising and lumber, and then started building his own ships. In time, he had one of the largest fleets of sailing ships on the east coast, all built in Delaware.

Professional and political career
Hall served in the Delaware Senate during the 1867/68 session and the 1869/70 session. In 1874 he was nearly nominated for governor, but it was New Castle County's turn in the informal rotation. Finally, in 1878 he was elected Governor of Delaware, overwhelmingly defeating Kensey J. Steward, the Greenback Labor candidate. Leftover bitterness from the Civil War caused the Democratic Party to be so completely in control that the Republican Party did not even hold a convention or field a candidate. Hall served from January 21, 1879 until January 16, 1883.

The Democratic Party was the conservative party of the day, and accordingly Hall supported conservative positions. He was a strong supporter of states' rights in opposition to the increasing reach of the federal government. Then that reach was generally in support of racial equality, a concept strongly opposed by Democrats in Delaware. Hall did support the setting up of a separate state Board of Education, and an office of Insurance Commissioner. All the while he was governor he was also a director of the Farmers' Bank of Delaware, having served from 1861 until he left office in 1883. After several years out of office he returned to the Delaware Senate for the 1891/92 and 1893/94 sessions, serving there until his death.

Death and legacy
Hall died at Frederica and is buried near there at Barratt's Chapel Cemetery. His home at Frederica is a contributing property in the Frederica Historic District.

Almanac
Elections are held the first Tuesday after November 1. Members of the Delaware General Assembly took office the first Tuesday of January. State senators have a four-year term. The governor takes office the third Tuesday of January and has a four-year term.

References

Images
Hall of Governors Portrait Gallery. Portrait courtesy of Historical and Cultural Affairs, Dover

External links
Biographical Directory of the Governors of the United States
Delaware’s Governors

The Political Graveyard

Places with more information
Delaware Historical Society; website; 505 North Market Street, Wilmington, Delaware 19801; (302) 655-7161
University of Delaware; Library website; 181 South College Avenue, Newark, Delaware 19717; (302) 831-2965

1817 births
1892 deaths
Methodists from Delaware
People from Kent County, Delaware
Farmers from Delaware
Democratic Party Delaware state senators
Democratic Party governors of Delaware
Burials in Kent County, Delaware
19th-century American politicians